South Gippsland, a region of Gippsland in Victoria, Australia, is a well-watered region consisting of low, rolling hills descending to the coast in the south and the Latrobe Valley in the north. Low granite hills continue into Wilsons Promontory, the southernmost point of Victoria and mainland Australia. Rivers are generally very short and impossible to dam owing to the lack of potential storage sites, but groundwater of good quality is readily available. The major industries are forestry and dairy farming, and the principal towns include Cowes (on Phillip Island), Leongatha, Korumburra, Wonthaggi and Foster.

Wilsons Promontory National Park features eucalypt forests and rainforests as well as its famous beaches, and is one of the most popular holiday areas in Victoria.  Linked to mainland South Gippsland via a bridge at San Remo, Phillip Island is also a major tourist destination, noted particularly for its surf beaches, nightly Penguin Parade and Grand Prix track.  12,000 years ago, South Gippsland formed part of a land bridge to Tasmania the remnants of which is the Furneaux Group of islands.  A ferry operates from Welshpool to Lady Barron Island, part of the Furneaux Group.

Regions of Victoria (Australia)
Gippsland (region)